Qumqoʻrgʻon is a district of Surxondaryo Region in Uzbekistan. The capital lies at the city Qumqoʻrgʻon.

The district consists of one city (Qumqoʻrgʻon), 11 urban-type settlements (Hurriyat, Elbayon, Elobod, Azlarsoy, Bogʻora, Oqsoy, Jiydali, Navbahor, Qarsoqli, Yangiyer, Jaloir) and 8 rural communities (Oqqapchigʻay, Jaloir Qoʻrgʻoni, Sheroziy, Oqjar, Qumqoʻrgʻon, Yuqori Kakaydi, Ketmon, Arslonboyli).

References

Surxondaryo Region
Districts of Uzbekistan